The Bostobe Formation is a geological formation in Qaraghandy & Qyzylorda, Kazakhastan whose strata date back to the Late Cretaceous (Santonian to early Campanian stages, approximately 85 Ma).

The sandstones and claystones of the formation were deposited in estuarine, fluvial-lacustrine and fluvial-deltaic environments. 

Dinosaur remains are among the fossils that have been recovered from the formation.

Fossil content 
Khunnuchelys lophorhothon, a trionychid turtle recovered from the formation, was initially thought to belong to a hadrosaurid dinosaur and classified as cf. Lophorhothon sp.

Mammals
 Beleutinus orlovi
 Zhalmouzia bazhanovi
 Parazhelestes sp.

Ankylosaurs
 Ankylosauridae indet.
Ornithopods
 Aralosaurus tuberiferus
 Arstanosaurus akkurganensis
 Batyrosaurus rozhdestvenskyi

Sauropods
 Titanosauridae indet.
 Sauropoda indet.

Theropods
 Caenagnathidae indet.
 Troodontidae indet.
 Therizinosauria indet.
 Ornithomimidae indet.
 Tyrannosauroidea indet.

Pterosaurs
 Aralazhdarcho bostobensis
 Samrukia nessovi

Turtles
 Adocus foveatus
 Anatolemys maximus
 Khunnuchelys lophorhothon
 Lindholmemys gravis
 Shachemys baibolatica
 Trionyx kansaiensis, T. onomatoplokos, T. riabinini

Other reptiles
 Bishara backa

Amphibians
 Anura indet.
 Eoscapherpeton
Fish
 Gobiates sp.

Flora
 Ulmaceae indet.

See also 
 List of dinosaur-bearing rock formations
 List of fossiliferous stratigraphic units in Kazakhstan
 Bissekty Formation
 Madygen Formation
 Karabastau Formation
 Kugitang Svita

References

Bibliography

Further reading 

 A. O. Averianov. 2007. Theropod dinosaurs from Late Cretaceous deposits in the northeastern Aral Sea region, Kazakhstan. Cretaceous Research 28:532-544
 E. G. Kordikova, S. M. Kurzanov, and G. F. Gunnell. 1997. Unusual dinosaur claw phalanxes from the Upper Cretaceous of the northeastern Aral Sea region, Kazakhstan. Journal of Morphology 232(3):278
 L. A. Nessov. 1995. Dinozavri severnoi Yevrazii: Novye dannye o sostave kompleksov, ekologii i paleobiogeografii [Dinosaurs of northern Eurasia: new data about assemblages, ecology, and paleobiogeography]. Institute for Scientific Research on the Earth's Crust, St. Petersburg State University, St. Petersburg 1-156
 L. A. Nessov. 1988. Late Mesozoic amphibians and lizards of Soviet Middle Asia. Acta Zoologica Cracoviensia 31(14):475-486
 L. A. Nessov. 1984. Data on late Mesozoic turtles from the USSR. Studia Geologica Salamanticensia, vol. especial 1 (Studia Palaeocheloniologica I) 1:215-223
 L. A. Nessov. 1981. Amfibii i reptilii v ekosistemakh Mela sredney Azii [Amphibia and reptiles in Cretaceous ecosystems of central Asia]. In I. V. Darevsky (ed.), The Problems of Herpetology. Fifth Herpetological Conference. Abstracts 91-92
 A. K. Rozhdestvensky. 1964. Novye dannye o mestonakhozhdeniyakh dinozavrov na territorii Kazakhstana i Srednei Azii [New data on occurrences of dinosaurs in Kazakhstan and Central Asia]. Tashkentskii Gosudarstvennyi Universitet, Nauchnye Trudy: Geologiya [Tashkent State University, Scientific Publications: Geology] 234:227-241

Geologic formations of Kazakhstan
Upper Cretaceous Series of Asia
Cretaceous Kazakhstan
Campanian Stage
Santonian Stage
Sandstone formations
Shale formations
Deltaic deposits
Fluvial deposits
Lacustrine deposits
Fossiliferous stratigraphic units of Asia
Paleontology in Kazakhstan
Formations
Formations